Olive Mary Hilliard ( Hillary, 4 July 1925 – 30 November 2022) was a South African botanist and taxonomist. Hilliard authored 372 land plant species names, the fifth-highest number of such names authored by any female scientist.

Hilliard was born in Durban on 4 July 1925. She attended Natal University from 1943 to 1947, where she obtained an MSc and later a PhD. She worked at the National Herbarium in Pretoria in 1947-48 and was a lecturer in botany at Natal University from 1954 to 1962. In 1963 she became curator of the herbarium at Natal University and a research fellow. Her special fields of interest were the flora of Natal and the taxonomy of Streptocarpus, Compositae and Scrophulariaceae.

In 1964 she formed a professional and personal collaboration with Brian Laurence Burtt (1913-2008) who played a large part in the revitalising of a moribund Royal Botanic Garden Edinburgh. Their collaboration resulted in numerous papers and three books, Streptocarpus: an African Plant Study (1971), The Botany of the Southern Natal Drakensberg (1987), and Dierama: The Hairbells of Africa (1991).

Hilliard died on 30 November 2022, at the age of 97.

Legacy
Hilliard collected specimens, mostly from the Natal Drakensberg and Malawi, number some 8000 (of which 5000 were collected with B. L. Burtt). She is commemorated in the 2 genera of Hilliardia and Hilliardiella (both in the Asteraceae family). She is also honoured in Plectranthus hilliardiae , Schizoglossum hilliardiae , Cymbopappus hilliardiae , Agalmyla hilliardiae  and Helichrysum hilliardiae

Works
 Hilliard, OM, BL Burtt 1971. Streptocarpus: an African Plant Study
 Hilliard, OM. 1983. Flora of Southern Africa Series. Ed. Balogh Scientific Books. 325 pp.  
 Hilliard, OM, BL Burtt 1985. A Revision of Geranium in Africa south of the Limpopo. (Notes from the Royal Botanic Garden Edinburgh. Vol. XLII no. 2)
 Hilliard, OM. 1987. The Botany of the Southern Natal Drakensberg (Annals of Kirstenbosch Botanic Gardens) Ed. National Botanic Gardens. 253 pp.  
 Hilliard, OM, BL Burtt 1991. Dierama: The Hairbells of Africa. Ed. Timber Press, Inc. 152 pp.  
 Hilliard, OM. 1995. The Manuleae: A Tribe of Scrophulariaceae. Ed. Edinburgh University Press. 600 pp.  
 Hilliard, OM, LS Davis (illustrator). 1997. Trees & Shrubs of Natal (Ukhahlamba). Ed. Univ. of Kwazulu Natal Press; 2ª ed. 48 pp.  
 Hilliard, OM. 1997. Flowers of the Natal Drakensberg: The Lily, Iris And Orchid Family And Their Allies (Ukhahlamba S.) Ed. Univ. of Kwazulu Natal Press. 85 pp.

References

1925 births
2022 deaths
20th-century South African botanists
20th-century South African women scientists
Botanists with author abbreviations
South African taxonomists
South African women botanists
Women taxonomists